Ormskirk School is a coeducational secondary school and sixth form located in Ormskirk in the English county of Lancashire.

The school caters for roughly 1,400 pupils aged between 11-18.

History
The school was created in September 2001 by the amalgamation of two schools in Ormskirk – Cross Hall High School and Ormskirk Grammar School, an investment costing £900 million.

In September 2004, the school moved in to a new building on Wigan Road, with an official opening by Prince Andrew, Duke of York the following year on 18 October 2005.

Ormskirk School was previously awarded Specialist Arts College status, and up until 2011 pupils were required to take an art as a GCSE.

Previously a voluntary controlled school administered by Lancashire County Council, in April 2022 Ormskirk School converted to academy status. The school is now sponsored by the Endeavour Learning Trust.

References

External links 
 Ormskirk School official website

Ormskirk school
Educational institutions established in 2001
Schools in the Borough of West Lancashire
Secondary schools in Lancashire
Academies in Lancashire
2001 establishments in England